Farrand Douglas Gillie (May 11, 1905 – October 7, 1972) was a Canadian professional ice hockey left winger who played in one National Hockey League game for the Detroit Cougars during the 1928–29 NHL season. After his lone game in the NHL, Gillie spent several years in the minor International Hockey League before moving to the United Kingdom for one season, finishing his career in the Quebec Senior Hockey League, retiring in 1942.

Career statistics

Regular season and playoffs

See also
List of players who played only one game in the NHL

External links

1905 births
1972 deaths
Brighton Tigers players
Canadian expatriate ice hockey players in England
Canadian expatriate ice hockey players in the United States
Canadian ice hockey left wingers
Detroit Cougars players
Detroit Olympics (CPHL) players
Detroit Olympics (IHL) players
Ice hockey people from Ontario
London Tecumsehs players
Rochester Cardinals players
Sportspeople from Cornwall, Ontario
Windsor Bulldogs (1929–1936) players